The following is a list of Singaporean electoral divisions from 1968 to 1972 that served as constituencies that elected Members of Parliament (MPs) to the 2nd Parliament of Singapore in the 1968 Singaporean general elections. It was the first general election since its independence on 9 August 1965 when Singapore separated from the then Federation of Malaya. The number of seats in Parliament had increased by 7 to 58 seats.

Constituencies

Reference

External links 
 

1968